Gennadius of Massilia (died c. 496), also known as Gennadius Scholasticus or Gennadius Massiliensis, was a 5th-century Christian priest and historian.

His best-known work is De Viris Illustribus ("Of Famous Men"), a biography of over 90 contemporary significant Christians, which continued a work of the same name by Jerome.

Life

Gennadius was a priest of Massilia (now Marseille) and a  contemporary of Pope Gelasius I.

Nothing is known of his life, save what he tells us himself in the last of the biographies he wrote: "I, Gennadius, presbyter of Massilia, wrote eight books against all heresies, five books against Nestorius, ten books against Eutyches, three books against Pelagius, a treatise on the thousand years of the Apocalypse of John, this work, and a letter about my faith sent to blessed Gelasius, bishop of the city of Rome".

Gelasius reigned from 492 to 496, so Gennadius must have lived at the end of the 5th century.

Writings

Gennadius knew Greek well and was well read in Eastern and Western, orthodox and heretical Christian literature. He was a diligent compiler and a competent critic.

De Viris Illustribus

De Viris Illustribus, in its most commonly accepted form was probably published c. 495 and contains, in some ten folio pages, short biographies of ecclesiastics between the years 392 and 495.  It is a very important source and in part the only source of our acquaintance with the over ninety authors treated therein.

It is a continuation of St. Jerome's De Viris Illustribus. In that work Jerome had for the first time drawn up a series of 135 short biographies of famous Christians, with lists of their chief writings. It was the first patrology and dictionary of Christian biography. This book of reference was so useful that it naturally became popular, and many people wrote continuations after the same method. We hear of such a continuation by one Paterius, a disciple of Jerome, and of a Greek translation by Sophronius.

It was Gennadius's continuation that became most popular and was accepted everywhere as a second part of Jerome's work, and was always written (eventually printed) together with his. Gennadius's part contains about one hundred lives, modelled closely after those of Jerome.  Various edits and reprints do not number them consistently; by Bernoulli, i to xcvii, with some marked as xciib, etc., originally cxxxvi-ccxxxii).

The series is arranged more or less in chronological order, but there are frequent exceptions.

In xc, 92, he says (in one version) that Theodore of Coelesyria (Theodulus) "died three years ago, in the reign of Zeno". From this Czapla deduces that Gennadius wrote between 491 and 494.

The present form of the text indicates a repeated revision of the entire work. Other people have modified it and added to it without noting the fact—as is usual among medieval writers.  Some scholars including Richardson and Czapla consider that chapters xxx (Bishop John II of Jerusalem), lxxxvii (Victorinus), xciii (Caerealis of Africa.), and all the end portion (xcv-ci), are not authentic. There is doubt about parts of the others.

Other writings

Gennadius states that he composed a number of other works, most of which are not extant:

Adversus omnes hæreses libri viii., "Against all heresies" in 8 volumes
Five books against Nestorius
Ten books against Eutyches
Three books against Pelagius
Tractatus de millennio et de apocalypsi beati Johannis, "Treatise on the thousand years and on the Apocalypse of St. John"
Epistola de fide, a "letter of faith" which he sent to Pope Gelasius.
Works of Evagrius Ponticus and of Timothy Ælurus, translated and restored to their authentic form. These translations are also lost.

De Ecclesiasticis Dogmatibus

There is a treatise called De Ecclesiasticis Dogmatibus ("Of Church Doctrine") which was originally attributed to Augustine of Hippo but is now universally attributed to Gennadius.  The work was long included among those of St. Augustine.

Some scholars (Carl Paul Caspari, Otto Bardenhewer, Bruno Czapla) think that it is probably a fragment of Gennadius's eight books "against all heresies", apparently the last part, in which, having confuted the heretics, he builds up a positive system.

Publication
The De Viris Illustribus was edited and published by J. Andreas (Rome, 1468), by J. A. Fabricius in Bibliotheca ecclesiastica (Hamburg, 1718), and by E. C. Richardson in Texte und Untersuchungen, xiv. (Leipsig, 1896).  It also appears with many editions of the works of Jerome.

An English translation by Richardson was produced in the Nicene and Post-Nicene Fathers, 2nd ser, iii. 385–402.

A critical edition of the Liber de Ecclesiasticis Dogmatibus under the title Liber Ecclesiasticorum Dogmatum was published by C. H. Turner in the Journal of Theological Studies vii. (1905), pp. 78–99 at pp. 89–99. Turner's introduction reviews a number of previous editions and also provides a survey of manuscript copies that were known to him, including several that he used for the edition.

Attitude and views

There are many indications that the author was a Semipelagian in "De Viris Illustribus". Semipelagians are warmly praised (Fastidiosus, lvi, p. 80; Cassian, lxi, 81; Faustus of Riez, lxxxv, 89); full Pelagians (Pelagius himself, xlii, 77; Julian of Eclanum, xlv, 77) are heretics; Catholics are treated shabbily (Augustine of Hippo, xxxviii, 75; Prosper of Aquitaine, lxxxiv, 89); even popes are called heretics (Julius I, in i, 61).

The same tendency is confirmed by the treatise "De eccles. dogmatibus", which is full of Semipelagianism, either open or implied (original sin carefully evaded, great insistence on free will and denial of predestination, grace as an adjutorium in the mildest form, etc.).

Gennadius considers (like later writers, e.g. Thomas Aquinas) that all men, even those alive at the Second Coming, will have to die. But this conviction, though derived from a widespread patristic tradition, is, he admits, rejected by equally catholic and learned Fathers.

Of the theories concerning the soul of man subsequently known as the creationist and the traducianist views, he espouses the creationist. He will not allow the existence of the spirit as a third element in man besides the body and the soul, but regards it as only another name for the soul.

In De Ecclesiasticis Dogmatibus, his views include the following points.
Heretical baptism is not to be repeated, unless it has been administered by heretics who would have declined to employ the invocation of the Holy Trinity.
He recommends weekly reception of the Eucharist by all not under the burden of mortal sin. Such as are should have recourse to public penitence.
He will not deny that private penance may suffice; but even here outward manifestation, such as change of dress, is desirable.
Daily reception of holy communion he will neither praise nor blame.
Evil was invented by Satan.
Though celibacy is rated above matrimony, to condemn marriage is Manichean.
A twice-married Christian should not be ordained.
Churches should be called after martyrs, and the relics of martyrs honoured.
None but the baptized attain eternal life; not even catechumens, unless they suffer martyrdom.
Penitence thoroughly avails to Christians even at their latest breath.
The Creator alone knows our secret thoughts. Satan can learn them only by our motions and manifestations.
Marvels might be wrought in the Lord's name even by bad men. Men can become holy without such marks.
The freedom of man's will is strongly asserted, but the commencement of all goodness is assigned to divine grace.

The language of Gennadius is here not quite Augustinian; but neither is it Pelagian.

References

Attribution

External links
Opera Omnia by Migne Patrologia Latina with analytical indexes
 English translation of De Viris at the Christian Classics Ethereal Library

5th-century Christian clergy
5th-century Gallo-Roman people
History of Marseille
Writers from Marseille
5th-century Latin writers
5th-century historians
Clergy from Marseille
Ancient Massaliotes